The Men's 10 metre air pistol event took place on 9 April 2018 at the Belmont Shooting Centre. Jitu Rai won the gold medal with a Games Record score. Kerry Bell won the silver medal and Om Mitharval won the bronze. Defending champion Daniel Repacholi came in 4th.

Results

Preliminares

Final
The full final results were:

References

Shooting at the 2018 Commonwealth Games